Katty Martínez Abad (born 14 March 1998) is a Mexican professional footballer who plays as a forward for Liga MX Femenil side Club América and the Mexico women's national team.

International career
Martínez represented Mexico at two CONCACAF Women's U-20 Championship editions (2015 and 2018) and two FIFA U-20 Women's World Cup editions (2016 and 2018). She made her senior debut on 27 February 2019 in a friendly match against Italy.

International goals
Scores and results list Mexico's goal tally first

Career statistics

Club

Honors and awards

Club
UANL
Liga MX Femenil: Clausura 2018, Clausura 2019, Apertura 2020

International
Mexico U20
 CONCACAF Women's U-20 Championship: 2018

References

External links
 
 

1998 births
Living people
Women's association football forwards
Mexican women's footballers
Footballers from Nuevo León
Mexico women's international footballers
Pan American Games competitors for Mexico
Footballers at the 2019 Pan American Games
Liga MX Femenil players
Tigres UANL (women) footballers
Mexican people of Lebanese descent
Mexican footballers